The 2015 Professional Indoor Football League season was the fourth and last season of the Professional Indoor Football League (PIFL). The regular season began March 27, 2015, and end on June 20, 2015. Each team played an 11 or 12-game schedule. The top 4 teams in the league advanced to the playoffs that began on June 27, 2015.

Pre-season
The Erie Explosion joined the league, after playing two seasons in Continental Indoor Football League. The Explosion took the place of the Georgia Fire, who were created by the league to fill the void of the Albany Panthers, who folded in January 2014.

The Harrisburg Stampede abruptly folded prior to the 2015 season due to financial problems.

Regular season

Playoffs

Awards
Most Valuable Player - Terrence Ebagua, Columbus Lions
Offensive Player of the Year - Jonathan Bane, Richmond Raiders 
Defensive Player of the Year - Jerome Hayes, Trenton Freedom 
Offensive Rookie of the Year - Casey Kacz, Columbus Lions
Defensive Rookie of the Year - Joe Powell, Lehigh Valley Steelhawks
Special Teams Player of the Year - T. C. Stevens, Richmond Raiders 
Coach of the Year - James Fuller, Richmond Raiders

References

2015 Professional Indoor Football League season